Tetratricopeptide repeat protein 25 is a protein that in humans is encoded by the TTC25 gene.

References

Further reading